Leptolalax botsfordi is a species of frog in the family Megophryidae from Vietnam. It was recorded on Mount Fansipan, in Hoang Lien National Park, northern Vietnam.

References

botsfordi
Amphibians described in 2013